Longny les Villages (literally Longny the Villages) is a commune in the department of Orne, northwestern France. The municipality was established on 1 January 2016 by merger of the former communes of La Lande-sur-Eure, Longny-au-Perche (the seat), Malétable, Marchainville, Monceaux-au-Perche, Moulicent, Neuilly-sur-Eure and Saint-Victor-de-Réno.

See also 
Communes of the Orne department

References 

Communes of Orne
Populated places established in 2016
2016 establishments in France
Perche